Clubul Sportiv Sportul 2007 Șimleu Silvaniei, commonly known as Sportul Șimleu Silvaniei, Șimleu Silvaniei or simply as Sportul Șimleu, is a Romanian professional football club based in Șimleu Silvaniei, Sălaj County. The team was founded in 2007, but only one year later entered in a merge with Liga III side Flacăra Halmășd, club which previously cessioned its third tier place from Someşul Satu Mare. The club was renamed as FC Silvania Șimleu Silvaniei and at its best played at the level of Liga II, before it was dissolved in 2011. In the summer of 2011, Sportul Șimleu was re-activated and enrolled in the 5th tier, then in 2012 was enrolled in the 4th tier struggling for years to promote again in the national divisions. Finally, Sportul Șimleu Silvaniei promoted in the Liga III at the end of the 2020–21 season.

History

The surprising FC Silvania (2007–2011)

Sportul Șimleu Silvaniei was founded on 12 March 2007 in order to continue the football legacy from Șimleu Silvaniei, after the dissolution of the former team Mobila Șimleu Silvaniei. After only one year, the management of the club decided to enter in a merge with Liga III side Flacăra Halmășd, club which previously cessioned its third tier place from Someşul Satu Mare. The club was renamed as FC Silvania Șimleu Silvaniei and was coached by Mircea Bolba between June 2008 and October 2008, benefiting from the services of a lot of young talented players. "The team below Măgura Hill" it wasn't placed between the teams who were in cards for the promotion to Liga II, everyone thinking of FC Baia Mare, CFR II Cluj or CSM Sebeș, but carried away by the enthusiasm specific to young players and working with dedication and professionalism, the boys succeeded to finish the 2008–09 season on the 2nd position.

Occupying the 2nd place, the team was granted the right to participate at a promotion play-off to the Liga II. in this tournament șimleuanii met FC Caracal and CS Ineu winning both matches, 3–0 and 2–0. By doing this, the club promoted for the first time in its short history to the Liga II.

In the first year of Liga II, FC Silvania started with Dacian Nastai as the head coach and the team performed above expectations, especially in the first part of the season. At one point they were in the top 6 of the table, and have achieved promising results against teams such as Dacia Mioveni, UTA Arad or FCM Târgu Mureș. In the second half of the season the team didn't maintain its previous form and after a highly controversial match against FC Baia Mare they were penalised for violent conduct and were deducted three points by the Romanian Football Federation, besides losing the match 3–0 by decision. The team was finally ranked 11th, easily avoiding relegation.

In July 2010, FC Silvania appointed former CFR Cluj player Adrian Anca as the new general manager of the team and also constructions were started to modernize the Măgura Stadium for the start of the next season. Unfortunately the start of the new season didn't go according to plans and on 25 October 2010, Adrian Anca was sacked and was replaced by former Luceafărul Oradea manager Florin Farcaș. Unfortunately, before the start of the second half of the 2010–11 Liga II season the club was dissolved, thus ending a short but beautiful history.

A new beginning (2011–present)
After the dissolution of FC Silvania, the football squad moved back on the old entity, Sportul Șimleu Silvaniei, entity that was enrolled in the Liga V – Sălaj County (5th and the last division). After only one year, the team based in Șimleu Silvaniei received a wild card and entered directly in the Liga IV Sălaj, where it struggled for years to promote back in the national division. Sportul won its league at the end of the 2013–14 season, but lost 3–5 the promotion play-off against CSC Sânmartin, Bihor County champions. Sportul Șimleu finally promoted at the end of the 2020–21 season, even that it lost again its promotion play-off, this time 0–2 against Progresul Șomcuta Mare, Maramureș County champions.

Ground
Sportul Șimleu Silvaniei plays its home matches on the Măgura Stadium in Șimleu Silvaniei, with a capacity of 1,537 seats.

Honours

Leagues
Liga III
Runners-up (1): 2008–09

Liga IV – Sălaj County
Winners (2): 2013–14, 2019–20
Runners-up (1): 2008–09

Liga V – Sălaj County
Runners-up (1): 2011–12

Players

First team squad

Out on loan

Club officials

Board of directors

Current technical staff

League history

References

Association football clubs established in 2007
Football clubs in Sălaj County
Șimleu Silvaniei
Liga II clubs
Liga III clubs
Liga IV clubs
2007 establishments in Romania